XML Certification Program (XML Master) is an IT professional certification for XML and related technologies. There are two levels of XML Certifications, XML Master Basic certification and XML Master Professional certification, and more than 18,000 people have passed the examinations.

Certification paths

XML Master Professional Application Developer Certification
XML Master Professional Application Developer is a certificate for professionals who have demonstrated the ability to use technology in developing applications that deal with XML data. It is based on passing the Master Basic exam and the XML Master Professional Application Developer exam.

XML Master Professional Application Developer Certification Exam
Duration => 90 minutes
Number of Questions => 45
Required Passing Score => 70%

Exam Topics
Section 1 - DOM / SAX
Section 2 - DOM / SAX Programming
Section 3 - XSLT
Section 4 - XML Schema
Section 5 - XML Processing System Design Technology
Section 6 - Utilizing XML

XML Master Professional Database Administrator Certification
The XML Master Professional Database Administrator is a certificate for professionals who have demonstrated the ability to use technology in XQuery and XMLDB. It requires passing the XML Master Basic exam and the XML Master Professional Database Administrator exam.

XML Master Professional Database Administrator Certification Exam
Duration in minutes => 90 minutes
Number of Questions => 30
Required Passing Score => 80%

Exam Topics
Section 1 - Overview
Section 2 - XQuery, XPath
Section 3 - Manipulating XML Data
Section 4 - Creating XML Schema and Other XML Database Objects

XML Master Basic Certification
XML Master Basic is a certification for professionals who have demonstrated the ability to use XML and related technologies, based on passing the XML Master Basic certification exam.

XML Master Basic Certification Exam
Duration in minutes => 90 minutes
Number of Questions => 50
Minimum Passing Score => 70%

Exam Topics
Section 1 - XML Overview
Section 2 - Creating XML Documents
Section 3 - DTD
Section 4 - XML Schema
Section 5 - XSLT, XPath
Section 6 - Namespace

External links

XML Certification Program (XML Master) official website

Introduction to XML Certification Program: XML Master
XML Master Certification Practice Exam
XML Master Certification Success Stories

XML
Information technology qualifications